Anugerah Sukan Negara is an annual award ceremony in Malaysia, organised by the National Sports Council of Malaysia since 1966. The awards represent the nation's full recognition of remarkable Malaysian individuals from the world of sports, along with the greatest sporting achievements throughout the year.

Awards timeline

Ceremony

| 54th || 2019/20 || 22 March 2021 || Majestic Hotel, KL ||
|}
|}
| 55th || 2021 || 31 January 2023 || Banquet Hall, Casa 4, National Sports Council of Malaysia, KL ||

Winners by category

National Sportsman and Sportswoman of the Year

| 2019 / 2020
| Azizulhasni Awang || Cycling
| Tan Cheong Min || Wushu

| 2021
| Azizulhasni Awang || Cycling
| Pandelela Rinong || Diving

National Men's and Women's Team of the Year
Before 1997, this award category known as the Best Men's and Women's Team of the Year.

| 2019/2020
| Muhammad Rafiq Ismail Ahmad Muaz Mohd Fishol Muhammad Syafiq Ridhwan Abdul Malek || Bowling
| Pandelela Rinong and Leong Mun Yee || Diving
|}
| 2021
| Aaron Chia Soh Wooi Yik  || Badminton
| Natasha Mohamed Roslan [Faten Najihah Ahmad Naik]] Siti Safiyah Amirah Abdul Rahmanand Nur Syazwani Shahar || Bowling

National Paralympian Sportsman and Sportswoman of the Year
Before 2005, the National Paralympian Sportsman and Sportswoman of the Year were awarded at a separate award ceremony.

| 2019/20
| S Suresh || Para Archery
| No winner| 
|}
| 2021
| Bonnie Bunyau Gustin || Para Powerlifting
| Brenda Anellia Larry  || Para Swimming
|}

National Men's and Women's Coach of the Year
Before 2005, the National Men's and Women's Coach of the Year were awarded at a separate award ceremony, namely Anugerah Jurulatih Kebangsaan.

National Most Promising Sportsman and Sportswoman Award
The Most Promising Sportsman and Sportswoman Award discontinued to be awarded since 2002.

Sport Leadership Award
Hamzah Abu Samah was the inaugural winner of the sport leadership award in 1984.

 1984: Hamzah Abu Samah – Former President of the Olympic Council of Malaysia
 1985: No award
 1986: No award
 1987: Khir Johari – Former Deputy President of the Olympic Council of Malaysia
 1988: Thong Poh Nyen – Former Olympic Council of Malaysia Secretary
 1989:Tan Sri Elyas Omar – Former Malaysia National Cycling Federation President
 1990:Tunku Imran Tuanku Ja'afar – Former Squash Racket Association of Malaysia President
 1991:Tan Sri Murad Ahmad – Former Prisons Department of Malaysia Director General
 1992:Government of the State of Sarawak 
 1993:Tan Sri Abu Zarim Omar – Former Paralympic Council of Malaysia President
 1994:SMK Padang Midin, Kuala Terenganu
 1995:Majlis Sukan Daerah Rompin
 1996: Combined Old Boys' Rugby Association (Cobra)
 1997: The Organising Committee for Universiti Sains Malaysia-Penang Hockey Carnival
 1998: 
 1999: Noh Abdullah – Founding President of the Malaysian Amateur Baseball Association
 1999: Mohamad Taha Ariffin – Former Vice-President of the Football Association of Malaysia
 2000: Gan Boon Leong – Former President of the Malaysian Bodybuilding Federation
 2000: Darshan Singh Gill – Former President of the Asian Cycling Confederation 
 2001: H. R. M. Storey – Former Treasurer of the Malaysian Body Building Federation
 2002: Ramlan Harun – Executive Director for the Asian PGA
 2003: Peter Velappan – Former Secretary-General of the Asian Football Confederation
 2004: Rosmanizam Abdullah – Former Secretary-General of the Malay Cricket Association of Malaysia
 2005: P. S. Nathan – Malaysian Tenpin Bowling Congress President
 2006: Thomas Lee Mun Lung – Malaysian Golf Association President
 2006: Ahmad Sarji Abdul Hamid – Malaysian Lawn Bowls Federation President
 2007: Paul Mony Samuel – Former Secretary-General of the Asian Football Confederation
 2008: Ho Koh Chye – Former Malaysian Chef-de-Mission to the Beijing Olympics, former national field hockey coach and player
 2009: Edmund Yong – Former Asia-Pacific Golf Confederation Secretary-General
 2010: W. Y. Chin – President of the Malaysian Snooker and Billiards Federation and Vice-President of the Olympic Council of Malaysia
 2011: Kee Yong Wee – Former Wushu Federation of Malaysia President
 2012: Paul Mony Samuel – FIFA Development Officers, former Secretary-General of the Asian Football Confederation
 2012: Abu Samah Abdul Wahab – Malaysian National Cycling Federation President
 2013: Mohammad Anwar Mohammad Nor – President of the Malaysian Golf Association
 2014: Ong Poh Eng – President of the Malaysian Weightlifting Federation
 2015: Yeoh Choo Hock – Former Secretary-General of Asian Basketball Confederation
 2015: Kamaruzzaman Abu Kassim – President of the Malaysian Sailing Authority
 2016: N. Shanmuganrajah – Malaysian Gymnastics Federation Secretary
 2016: Mohd Ali Rustam – National Silat Association of Malaysia President
 2017: Wan Nawawi Wan Ismail – Malaysia Lawn Bowls Federation President
 2018: Sieh Kok Chi – Former Olympic Council of Malaysia Secretary
 2018: S. Radha Krishnan – Malaysian Blind Sports Association President
 2019/20: Allahyarham Datuk Seri Zolkples Embong – Former Director General National Sports Council of Malaysia
 2019/20: Datuk S Vegiyathuman – Former Secretary General Kuala Lumpur Athletics Association
 2019/20: Lt Kdr (B) Kamaruzaman Kadir – National Powerlifting Association of Malaysia

Sport Icon/Personality Award
Tunku Abdul Rahman was the first recipient of the prestigious award in 1978.

 1978: Tunku Abdul Rahman – Former Prime Minister of Malaysia
 1979: No award
 1980: No award
 1981: No award
 1982: No award
 1983: No award
 1984: No award
 1985: Sultan Ahmad Shah – Former Yang di-Pertuan Agong, former President of the Football Association of Malaysia
 1986:
 1987:
 1988: Abdul Razak Hussein – Former Prime Minister of Malaysia, former President of the Asian Hockey Federation
 1989:
 1990:
 1991: No award
 1992:
 1993:
 1994:
 1995: Toh Puan Dato' Seri Hajjah Saadiah Sardon – Former President of the Women Football Association of Malaysia
 1996: No award
 1997: Khir Johari – Former Deputy President of the Olympic Council of Malaysia
 1998: Hamzah Abu Samah – Former FIFA vice-president and International Olympic Committee member, former President of the Asian Football Confederation, 
 1999: Alexander Lee Yu Lung – Former President of the Malaysian Volleyball Association and also of the Squash Racquets Association of Malaysia, former vice-chairman of the Commonwealth Games Federation
 2000: No award
 2001: No award
 2002: Ghazali Shafie – Former President of the Malaysian Amateur Athletic Union
 2003: Mahathir Mohamad – Former Prime Minister of Malaysia
 2004: No award
 2005: Abdul Ghafar Baba – Former Deputy Prime Minister of Malaysia, former President of the Lawn Tennis Association of Malaysia
 2006: Sultan Azlan Shah – Former Yang di-Pertuan Agong, former Malaysian Chef-de-Mission to the Montreal Olympics, former President of the Asian Hockey Federation
 2007: Harun Idris – Former Malaysian Chef-de-Mission to the Munich Olympics, former President of the Football Association of Selangor
 2008: No award
 2009: No award
 2010: No award
 2011: No award
 2012: Tan Sri Elyas Omar – Former Malaysian Chef-de-Mission to the Barcelona Olympics, former President of the Badminton Association of Malaysia, 
 2013: No award
 2014: No award
 2015: Mani Jegathesan – Asian Amateur Athletics Association Medical Committee chairman, former National Sportsman of the Year
 2015: Ahmad Sarji Abdul Hamid – Chairman of Professional Golf of Malaysia, former President of the Asian Lawn Bowls Federation, former President of the Malaysia Lawn Bowls Federation, former President of the Malay Cricket Association of Malaysia
 2016: Tunku Imran Tuanku Ja'afar –  President of the Olympic Council of Malaysia
 2016: Tun Jeanne Abdullah – Patron of the Paralympic Council of Malaysia
 2017: Sultan Ahmad Shah – Former Yang di-Pertuan Agong, former President of the Football Association of Malaysia
 2018: No award
 2019/20: Dato' Sieh Kok Chi – Former Secretary General of Olympic Council of Malaysia
 2021: Datuk Hajjah Norminshah Sabirin – Former President of Netball Association of Malaysia

Special Award
Sidek Abdullah Kamar became the first recipient of the Special Award in 1986.

 1986: Sidek Abdullah Kamar – Former national badminton coach
 1987: No award
 1988: Christopher Chan Yan Kin – Former national squash champion
 1988: 1949 Thomas Cup badminton team (Ooi Teik Hock, Teoh Seng Khoon, Chan Kok Leong, Yeoh Teck Chye, Lim Kee Fong, Wong Peng Soon, Ong Poh Lim, Law Teik Hock)
 1988: 1952 Thomas Cup badminton team (Wong Peng Soon, Ooi Teik Hock, Chan Kok Leong, Abdullah Piruz, Ong Poh Lim, Ismail Marjan)
 1988: 1955 Thomas Cup badminton team (Ong Poh Lim, Wong Peng Soon, Eddy Choong, Ooi Teik Hock, Lim Kee Fong, Tan Jin Eong)
 1989:
 1990:
 1991: No award
 1992:
 1993: 
 1994:
 1995:
 1996: Fathil Mahmood – Former Equestrian Association of Malaysia Vice-President
 1996: A. Vaithilingam – Veteran athletics official
 1997: Daniel Lim – Retired national bowler
 1997: Sharon Low Su Lin – Retired national bowler
 1997: Tham Siew Kai – Former Sarawak Amateur Athletics Association Honorary Secretary
 1997: S. Kathiravale – Former national football referee and hockey umpire
 1998: Harjit Singh – Former Deputy President of the Malaysian Cricket Association
 1999: 
 2000: Ishtiaq Mubarak – Former national athlete and coach, Asian Games silver medalist in men's 110 metres hurdles
 2000: Karamjit Singh – Retired Malaysian professional race driver in rallying, the first Asian to win the FIA Production World Rally Championship
 2000: Awang Kamaruddin Abdul Ghani – Retired Malaysian horse racer
 2001: Leonard A. de Vries – Former national coaching committee chairman
 2001: Mary Ong Kwe Kee – Petaling Jaya Municipal Council squash coordinator
 2002: A. Perumal – Former Merdeka Stadium ground specialist
 2002: Abdul Malik Jeremiah – Equestrian
 2003: Abdul Majid Muda – Former Pahang Weightlifting Association Vice-President
 2003: Loh Beng Hooi – Former Sabah Karate Association Vice-President
 2003: Durbara Singh – National tennis coach
 2004: S. Satgunam – Former Malaysian Hockey Federation Secretary
 2004: Chin Mee Keong – Malaysian Taekwondo Association (MTA) chairman
 2005: M. K. Nathan – Veteran national cricket coach
 2005: Azmi Shaari – Former Secretary-General of the Sepak Takraw Association of Malaysia
 2005: Zainal Abidin Abu Zarin – President of Malaysian Paralympic Council and President of Asian Paralympic Committee
 2006: Balwant Singh Kler – Secretary General of the Asian Triathlon Confederation
 2006: Yeoh Cheang Swi – Former rugby player
 2006: Krishnan Thambusamy – Former athlete
 2007: Willy Chang Chia Chun – Former national tennis coach
 2007: C. Paramalingam – Former national field hockey coach
 2008: Petrina Low Lai Hun – Former national rhythmic gymnastic coach
 2008: Nellan Vellasamy – National professional golfer
 2009: Ponniyah Thulukanam – Former national karate coach
 2010: Nashatar Singh Sidhu – Former Asian Games gold medallist in men's javelin throw
 2010: Lim Tiong Kiat – Honorary Treasurer of the Badminton Association of Malaysia
 2011: Shaharudin Jaafar – Former national cycling champion
 2012: Muhammad Zulfahmi Khairuddin – World Moto3 Grand Prix racer
 2012: Ng Chow Seng – Former national weightlifting champion
 2013: Moe Chin Kiat – Former national badminton chief coach
 2013: Mohd Nazar Abdul Rahim – Former national shot put coach
 2014: Peter Rajah – Former national footballer
 2014: Mohd Afendy Abdullah – National sailing coach
 2015: No award
 2016: Mohd Morshidi Abdul Ghani – Sarawak State Secretary
 2016: Dina Rizal – SportsUnite sports club chairman
 2017: Hafizh Syahrin Abdullah – MotoGP rider
 2017: Johor Darul Ta'zim F.C. – Football club 
 2018: Rahim Razali – Sport announcer
 2018: Hanifah Yoong – Waterski

TM Team Malaysia Award
The TM Team Malaysia Award first introduced in 2013 by Telekom Malaysia. The winner would be selected by sports fans in the country via social website voting.
 2013: Sazali Samad – Ten-time world bodybuilding champion. See also: List of World Amateur Bodybuilding Championships medalists
 2014: Syakilla Salni Jefri Krisnan – Karateka
 2015: 
 Favourite Athlete: Goh Jin Wei – Badminton player
 Best Moment: 2012 London Olympic Games – Pandelela Rinong, first female athlete to win an Olympic medal for Malaysia
 Best Team: 1992 Thomas Cup – Badminton pair, Cheah Soon Kit / Soo Beng Kiang delivered a winning (3–2) set games for Malaysia to win the Thomas Cup
 2016: Azizulhasni Awang– Track cyclist

See also
Sports in Malaysia
Athlete of the Year

References

External links
Official website

 
Sport in Malaysia
Malaysia
Awards established in 1966
1966 establishments in Malaysia